Crayola Scoot is a sports video game developed by Climax Studios and published by Outright Games. It is based on the Crayola brand, taking heavy inspiration from games such as Splatoon with a similar paint/ink mechanic and the Tony Hawk's Pro Skater series instead riding a scooter rather than a skateboard, performing tricks and combos to complete challenges. It was released on October 16, 2018, in North America and October 23, 2018, in Europe for Microsoft Windows, Nintendo Switch, PlayStation 4, and Xbox One.

Reception 
On Metacritic, the Nintendo Switch and Xbox One versions of Crayola Scoot received average scores of 74% and 66% respectively based on five reviews for each platform, indicating "mixed or average" reviews.

References 

2018 video games
Windows games
Nintendo Switch games
PlayStation 4 games
Xbox One games
Climax Group games
Video games developed in the United Kingdom
Crayola
Video games based on works
Sports video games
Multiplayer and single-player video games
PlayStation 4 Pro enhanced games
Xbox One X enhanced games
Video games with cel-shaded animation
Outright Games games